Abronia ornelasi, Ornelas's arboreal alligator lizard or Cerro Baul alligator lizard,  is a species of arboreal alligator lizard in the family Anguidae. The species, which was originally described in 1984 by Jonathan A. Campbell, is endemic to southern Mexico.

Etymology
The specific name, ornelasi, is in honor of Julio Ornelas Martinez who assisted Campbell in fieldwork in Mexico.

Geographic range
A. ornelasi is found in the Mexican state of Oaxaca.

Habitat

Reproduction
A. ornelasi is viviparous.

References

Further reading
Campbell JA (1984). "A New Species of Abronia (Sauria: Anguidae) with Comments on the Herpetogeography of the Highlands of Southern Mexico". Herpetologica 40 (4): 373–381. (Abronia ornelasi, new species).
Campbell JA, Frost DR (1993). "Anguid lizards of the genus Abronia: revisionary notes, descriptions of four new species, a phylogenetic analysis, and key". Bulletin of the American Museum of Natural History (216): 1–121.
Casas-Andreu G, Méndez-de la Cruz FR, Aguilar-Miguel X (2004). "Anfibios y Reptiles ". pp. 375–390. In: García-Mendoza AJ, Ordóñez Díaz MJ, Briones-Salas M (editors) (2004). Biodiversidad de Oaxaca. México, Distrito Federal: Universidad Nacional Autónoma de México, Instituto de Biología World Wildlife Fund; Oaxaca, Oaxaca: Fondo Oaxaqueño para la Conservación de la Naturaleza. 605 pp. . (in Spanish).
Mata-Silva V, Johnson JD, Wilson LD, García-Padilla E (2015). "The herpetofauna of Oaxaca, Mexico: composition, physiographic distribution, and conservation status". Mesoamerican Herpetology 2 (1): 6-62.

Abronia
Reptiles described in 1984
Endemic reptiles of Mexico